Ramkhamhaeng University (RU) is Thailand's largest public university. It was named in honour of King Ramkhamhaeng the Great of Sukhothai. The university provides an effective and economical way to meet public demand for higher education.

Overview
Ramkhamhaeng University has two major campuses, both in Bangkok. Freshman classes are held at Bang Na campus in Phra Khanong District. Most others classes are conducted at the main campus at Hua Mak, Bang Kapi District. Approximately 435,000 students attend the university, 400,000 undergraduates and 35,000 graduate students. Tuition fees are in the range of 7,155–8,880 baht per academic year. The university's budget 
allocation from the central government for FY2019 is 1,179 million baht, down from FY2018.

Curriculum 
 Humanities and Social Sciences
 Faculty of Law
 Common law Department
 Public law Department
 International law Department
 Procedural law Department
 Civil law Department
 Commercial law Department
 Law and development Department
 Faculty of Political Science
 Plan A (Government)
 Plan B (International relations)
 Plan C (Public administration)
 Faculty of Humanities
 English language
 Thai language
 Chinese language
 French language
 German language
 Spanish language
 Russian language
 Japanese language
 Philosophy
 History
 Sociology and Anthropology
 Library and information science
 Heritage tourism
 Faculty of Business Administration
 Management
 Finance and Banking
 Marketing
 Digital Business Communication
 Hospitality Industry and Tourism
 Human Resource Management
 International business
 Logistics and Supply Chain Management
 Accounting
 Faculty of Economics
 Mathematical economics
 Financial risk management
 Public Finance and Economic Development
 International Economics and Globalization
 Agricultural economics
 Faculty of Education
 Education Department
 Primary education
 English language
 Chinese language
 Social studies
 Mathematics
 Computer science education
 Physical education
 Health education
 Sports science
 Recreation
 Sports science
 Educational research
 Educational technology
 Lifelong learning
 Special education
 Agro-Industrial Complex
 Home economics
 Psychology
 Counseling psychology
 Industrial and organizational psychology
 Geography
 Educational management
 Thai language
 Early childhood education
 Visual arts education
 Science
 Faculty of Fine and Applied Arts
 Thai Dancing Art
 Thai Music
 Popular music
 Western music
 Faculty of Mass Communication
 Mass communication
 Intergated Communication 
 Multimedia journalism
 Broadcasting
 Faculty of Human Resource Development
 Human Resource Development
 Faculty of Business service
 Cultural tourism
 Faculty of Social Science
 Social science
 Institute of International Studies
 Science and Technology
 Faculty of Science
 Mathematics
 Statistical Science
 Chemistry
 Physics
 Biology
 Computer science
 Operations research
 Materials science
 Food technology
 Electronics
 Biotechnology
 Environmental science
 Agricultural technology
 Radiographer
 Information technology
 Faculty of Engineering
 Civil engineering
 Industrial engineering
 Environmental engineering
 Computer engineering
 Health Sciences
 Faculty of Public Health
 Public health
 Faculty of Optometry

References

External links
 Ramkhamhaeng University

Universities and colleges in Bangkok
Educational institutions established in 1971
Bang Kapi district
Ramkhamhaeng University
1971 establishments in Thailand
Universities established in the 1970s